The Lanciafiamme Spalleggiato Modello 35, also known as  Model 35, was a flamethrower issued to the Royal Italian Army in the Second Italo-Ethiopian War. In 1940 it was replaced by the Lanciafiamme Spalleggiato Modello 40, which uses a different ignition system.

History 
Model 35 was adopted by the Royal Italian Army in 1935. Units were assigned to a "Flamethrower Platoon". Each of 3 squads, which consisted of six sections, were assigned two weapons. In 1939, 176 copies of this model were sold to the Finnish Army, who used the renamed Lanciafiamme  M/40 against the Red Army during the Winter War. During the Second World War, Model 35 was issued to a division at the Greek-Albanian front. The newer Model 40, which replaced the Model 35 as the Italian Army's principal flamethrower in 1940, was issued mostly to the Italian corps. Model 40 was employed largely in Italy's North African Campaign against the British and with Italian units in Russia.

The Model 35 was heavier than its contemporaries and had inferior performance to those weapons, having a shorter range than the equivalent German model.

Components

Model 35 

The  Model 35 had three major elements: the tank, the lance and the ignition system.

The tank was carried via two transport belts and padded back. It was composed of two cylinders. Each was divided internally into two parts by a metal diaphragm. The two upper sections were linked together and could hold 6 litres of nitrogen at 20 atmospheres, which acted as a propellant. The lower halves were also connected and contained 12 litres of fuel, a mixture composed of 9 parts diesel oil and 1 part gasoline. Both substances were loaded from special openings on the upper end of the cylinders, where a manual valve conveyed the liquid nitrogen in the tank to pressurize them at the moment of use. The filler pipe coupling of the lance was located in the lower part of the tank, beside the right cylinder.

The lance has a control lever of lightweight alloy that connects to the tank through a hose. At the muzzle of the lance, a large flange ("cartoccia") has a double ignition system. The main system was initially made of two sharpening sheets of steel, with flint and rollers to create sparks from friction, actuated by the control lever. It was later replaced by an electrical system: a square box, placed posterior to the cylinders housed an 18 volt battery with a dynamo for manual recharging. Two electric cables run up the lance to the flange, each serving as a spark plug similar to that of a car. The spark ignited the jet of gas that poured from the lance. A secondary system consists of the "bengalotto," a slow-burning pyrotechnic device that is manually ignited and mounted on the weapons sight, burning for 2 minutes. On the passage of the flammable liquid, operated by the lever on the lance, it launched a dart of up to 20 meters of range, which produced a heat zone 35 meters wide and 15 deep. The "bengalotto," however, though simple and reliable, was unfortunately prone to revealing the user's position to enemy forces.

The weapon was carried by two soldiers, flammieri, protected by fireproof vests. The system, due to its weight and the overall dimensions of the fireproof suit, could be carried only for short distances. It was normally transported on trucks or on special donkey saddle. The flammable liquid reserves allowed about 20 blasts. Recharging the weapon could take 20 minutes or more.

Model 40 
The  Model 40 carried an improved electrical ignition system, made from a high-voltage magnet. This was activated by a turbine flow, set in motion by the pressurized flow of the liquid fuel at the time of launch. The electrical connection fed the spark plug and ignited the jet. The flange still retained the "bengalotto" tube as a secondary ignition system. Otherwise, major components of the weapon and its performance remained unchanged.

Further developments 
The excessive weight of the system on the battlefield led to the development of the Lanciafiamme Model 41, which was lighter, with a slightly modified electrical system. For shock troops and paratroopers, a lighter version that could be held as a rifle was developed, called the  Model 41 d'assalto. The Italian armed forces also used the Lanciafiamme Carrellato  Model 42, a heavy model intended for engineers rather than assault troops.

See also 
 Flamethrower

Notes

Bibliography 
 Le armi della fanteria italiana nella seconda guerra mondiale, Nicola Pignato, Albertelli Ed., 1978.
 Tactical and Technical Trends, United States Department of War, n. 34, 1943.

Flamethrowers
World War II infantry weapons of Italy